Richard Farmer (1735–1797) was a Shakespearean scholar and Master of Emmanuel College, Cambridge.

Richard Farmer may also refer to:

Richard T. Farmer, American businessman
Richard Farmer (director), film, commercial and music video director
Richie Farmer (born 1969), former Commissioner of Agriculture for the Commonwealth of Kentucky

See also
Farmer (surname)